Luis Aranda (born 3 September 1936) is an Argentine boxer. He competed in the men's light welterweight event at the 1960 Summer Olympics. At the 1960 Summer Olympics, he defeated Rogelio Reyes of Mexico, before losing to Piero Brandi of Italy.

References

1936 births
Living people
Argentine male boxers
Olympic boxers of Argentina
Boxers at the 1960 Summer Olympics
Boxers at the 1959 Pan American Games
Pan American Games silver medalists for Argentina
Pan American Games medalists in boxing
Sportspeople from Santa Fe, Argentina
Light-welterweight boxers
Medalists at the 1959 Pan American Games